Wolfram Gambke (born 2 November 1959 in Pinneberg, Schleswig-Holstein) is a retired West German javelin thrower.

Achievements

His personal bests are: 
old javelin model: 85,90 m (1984)
new javelin model: 81,30 m (1986)

References

1959 births
Living people
People from Pinneberg
West German male javelin throwers
Athletes (track and field) at the 1984 Summer Olympics
Olympic athletes of West Germany
Universiade medalists in athletics (track and field)
Universiade silver medalists for West Germany
Sportspeople from Schleswig-Holstein